Gheorghe Grozea (born 12 January 1945) is a Romanian former football forward.

International career
Gheorghe Grozea played four games at international level for Romania, including a match against Portugal at the 1970 World Cup qualifiers, which ended with a 3–0 loss.

Honours
Dinamo București
Divizia A: 1964–65
FC Galați
Divizia B: 1973–74

Notes

References

External links

Gheorghe Grozea at Labtof.ro

1945 births
Living people
Romanian footballers
Romania international footballers
Association football forwards
Liga I players
Liga II players
FC Dinamo București players
FC Petrolul Ploiești players
FCM Dunărea Galați players
FC Gloria Buzău players
People from Giurgiu